Hryhoriy Mykolayovych Dmytrenko (born 1 July 1945) is a Ukrainian former rower who competed for the Soviet Union in the 1980 Summer Olympics and for Ukraine in the 1996 Summer Olympics.

In 1980 he was the coxswain of the Soviet boat which won the bronze medal in the eights event. At the 1986 World Rowing Championships in Nottingham, he won a silver medal with the eight.

Twelve years later he coxed the Ukrainian boat which finished tenth in the 1996 eight competition.

References

1945 births
Living people
Ukrainian male rowers
Soviet male rowers
Coxswains (rowing)
Olympic rowers of the Soviet Union
Olympic rowers of Ukraine
Rowers at the 1980 Summer Olympics
Rowers at the 1996 Summer Olympics
Olympic bronze medalists for the Soviet Union
Olympic medalists in rowing
Medalists at the 1980 Summer Olympics
World Rowing Championships medalists for the Soviet Union
Sportspeople from Zhytomyr Oblast